Abu al-Fadl Muhammad al Tabasi (died 1089) was a Shafi‘i Muslim and Sufi author, who lived most of his life in Nishapur. Although many works are associated with him, his al-Shamil fi al-bahr al-kamil (The Comprehensive Compendium to the Entire Sea), a treatise about conjuring devils and jinn, seems to be most disseminated. Distinguishing between licit and illicit magic, he activates the spells by invoking the names of angels, prophets and cites Islamic sacred scriptures such as the Torah, the Gospel and certain Quranic verses, regarding such occult practises as in accordance with Islamic law, as long it is performed by virtues and not by sin. He was famous for his alleged own ability to subjugate jinn, as reported by encyclopedist and scholar of natural scientist Zakariya al-Qazwini.

References

1089 deaths
Tabasi 
Shafi'i fiqh scholars
Sufi writers